Esterpole  is a village in the administrative district of Gmina Brodnica, within Śrem County, Greater Poland Voivodeship, in west-central Poland.

The village has a population of 100.

The name Esterpole originates from Jozef Wybicki’s wife, Estera Wierusz-Kowalska. Prior to the name change, the village was called Przylepskie Oręby.

From 1975 to 1998, Esterpole administratively belonged to Poznań Voivodeship.

References

Esterpole